Dolly & Carol in Nashville is a television special starring Dolly Parton and Carol Burnett that was shot at The Grand Ole Opry and broadcast on CBS on Valentine's Day in 1979. It was part of a promotional campaign for Parton's recent album, Heartbreaker.

Program
The show opens with Dolly and Carol singing "What Am I Doing Up Here?" (frequently referred to as the "Pedestal Song") a comical number in which each declares the other belongs on a pedestal. As they sing, the boxes that they're seated on each rise into the air.

The next scene begins with a rendition of "Orange Blossom Special", but Carol fumbles with the banjo and proclaims, "No one picks like a Nashville picker picks." Seizing the opportunity, Dolly turns this line into a rousing song, and they soon find accompaniment from various musicians who are planted in the audience.

Next, Parton performs a gospel medley in the empty Ryman Auditorium, bookended by performances with Carol and a choir at the newer Opry house.

The show's only sketch features the stars as little girls. Trudy (Parton) is whiny and ignored by the boys, Marcy (Burnett) is a tomboy. The music of the Grand Ole Opry on the radio provides transitions through time as the girls age, featuring a few vintage radio introductions (Roy Acuff, Minnie Pearl, Marty Robbins) as the dancers pantomime to old country hits. Once they reach puberty, the children's roles suddenly reverse, as all of the boys lavish affections upon the busty Trudy. Eventually, we’re introduced to Trudy's daughter, Bonnie (Lindy Speight), and Marcy's daughter, Ellie (Erin Hamilton), who are just like their mothers. Trudy and Marcy then perform "Turn Around (Where Are You Going, My Little One?)."

The duo then performs a 9-minute medley of "heart" songs, which includes Parton's "Heartbreaker".

Dressed in frilly gowns, Carol and Dolly do a little song and dance routine, "It's a Kick (Kickin' Around with You)". They're soon interrupted by The Joe Layton Dancers, which segues into "No One Kicks Like a Nashville Kicker Kicks." As the number ends, the dancers surround the ladies with bouquets as members of the audience pelt the stars with flowers.

The ladies sing a brief reprise of "What Am I Doing Up Here?" and the credits roll.

Production & Release
Production occurred in January 1979 at the Grand Ole Opry House and Ryman Auditorium, with the bulk of filming occurring on the 9th and 10th. In a 2016 interview, Burnett misremembered that filming occurred around Thanksgiving, remarking that Parton had generously cooked a feast. It was Burnett's first special following the cancellation of her long-running variety show (although between, she starred in the feature-length pilot The Grass Is Always Greener Over the Septic Tank), and real-life daughter Erin Hamilton portrayed her child in the Girl Friends sketch.

The show was strategically timed to tie into a Valentine's Day promotional campaign for Parton's latest album, Heartbreaker. RCA Records provided over 3,000 American radio stations copies of the album and heart-shaped candy boxes for giveaways. Participating stations designed their own contests, which included drawings, call-ins, poetry competitions, and more.

Cast
Dolly Parton  (Self/Trudy)
Carol Burnett (Self/Marcy)
Erin Hamilton (Ellie)
Lindy Speight (Bonnie)
Tony Lyons (Grand Ole Opry Announcer)
John Faulk (Johnny)

Dancers
Dennis Botitis
Gene Castle
Ron Chisholm
Tom Fowler
Edward J. Heim (Don Gibson)
Don Johanson
Birl Jonns
Doug Okerson

Nashville Pickers
Lewis Phillips (6 year-old banjo player)
Little Roy Lewis 
Grandpa Jones (Banjo)
Ramona Jones (Banjo)
Bashful Brother Oswald (Banjo)
Mack Magaha (Fiddle)
Lewis Brown

Songs

Originals
By Ken and Mitzie Welch.
"What Am I Doing Up Here?"
"No One Picks Like a Nashville Picker" (/"Orange Blossom Special")
"It's a Kick (Kicking Around With You)"
"No One Kicks Like a Nashville Kicker"

Gospel Medley
The Wayfaring Stranger - Dolly
Swing Low, Sweet Chariot - Carol
Amazing Grace - Dolly
In the Sweet By and By - Dolly
I'll Fly Away - Dolly
Old Time Religion - Carol & Dolly
This Little Light of Mine - Carol & Dolly

Girlfriends Sketch
Turn Around (Where Are You Going, My Little One?) - Carol & Dolly
San Antonio Rose - Pee Wee King and the Golden West Cowboys
Cold, Cold Heart - Hank Williams
Hey, Good Lookin' - Hank Williams (also Carol)
Oh, Lonesome Me - Don Gibson

Heart Medley

My Funny Valentine
(You Gotta Have) Heart
Heart of My Heart
Dear Hearts and Gentle People
Deep in the Heart of Texas
My Heart Belongs to Daddy
My Heart Stood Still - Dolly
Don't Sweetheart Me - Carol
Good Hearted Woman - Dolly
Stout-hearted Men
Be Careful, It's My Heart - Carol
Heart and Soul - Dolly
My Foolish Heart - Carol
Heartaches by the Number - Dolly
More Than You Know - Carol	
Your Cheatin' Heart
My Heart Cries for You
Baby Won't You Please Come Home - Carol
Heartbreak Hotel - Dolly
St. Louis Blues  - Carol
How Can You Mend a Broken Heart?
There's a Broken Heart for Every Light on Broadway - Carol
It's a Heartache - Dolly & Carol
Good Morning Heartache - Carol
Heartbreaker - Dolly
Put a Little Love in Your Heart
A Cockeyed Optimist - Carol
My Funny Valentine (finale)

References

External links
 
Internet Archive - Full Special

1979 television specials
1970s American television specials
CBS television specials
Music television specials
Dolly Parton
Carol Burnett